World Trade Center attacks can refer to multiple attacks on the World Trade Center in the U.S. city of New York:
1993 World Trade Center bombing, in which the complex was damaged
September 11 attacks, in which the complex was destroyed